Direct from Brooklyn is a compilation of music videos by American alternative rock group They Might Be Giants.  It was released on VHS in 1999 and DVD in 2003. The title refers to the home of John Linnell and John Flansburgh, founding members of the band. Many of the music videos were filmed in Brooklyn and other parts of New York City.

Video listing 
The music videos run in reverse chronological order, from "Doctor Worm" (1999) to "Put Your Hand Inside the Puppet Head" (1986) with the exception of the last two videos, which are from 1990.
 "Doctor Worm"
 "Snail Shell"
 "The Guitar (The Lion Sleeps Tonight)"
 "The Statue Got Me High"
 "Istanbul (Not Constantinople)" (video 1)
 "Birdhouse In Your Soul"
 "They'll Need A Crane"
 "Purple Toupee"
 "Ana Ng"
 "(She Was A) Hotel Detective"
 "Don't Let's Start"
 "Put Your Hand Inside The Puppet Head"
 "Particle Man"
 "Istanbul (Not Constantinople)" (video 2)

Notes
The videos for "Particle Man" and "Istanbul (Not Constantinople)" are the animated videos from Tiny Toon Adventures. The first "Istanbul" video is an official animated video commissioned by Elektra Records.
The DVD includes commentary for each video, with the exception of "Snail Shell", the commentary track of which is the improvised song "Complete Paranoia".
The version of "Don't Let's Start" in the music video is the mix from the "Don't Let's Start" single.

DVD bonus tracks

Video 
<li>Why Does The Sun Shine? (live from the 2002 tour)

Audio tracks
<li>All MacGyver On It
<li>Your Mom's Alright
<li>Man, It's So Loud in Here (Hot 2002 Remix) 

Notes
"All MacGyver On It" and "Your Mom's Alright" were previously only available on foreign copies of Mink Car.

References

External links 
Direct from Brooklyn at This Might Be A Wiki

They Might Be Giants compilation albums
1999 video albums
1990s English-language films